Leonid Arnoldovich Fedun (born 5 April 1956) is a Ukrainian-born Russian billionaire businessman. A close associate of Vagit Alekperov, formerly a key figure in oil company Lukoil and Russia's most successful football club, Spartak Moscow, Fedun himself was involved with the two entities. In fact, between 2004 and 2022, Fedun was Spartak's top official and the second-largest shareholder. His business ventures have earned him numerous state awards (Order  For Merit to the Fatherland, 4th Order and the Order of Honour). With an estimated wealth of $8.5 billion (as of June 2019), critics have labelled Fedun as an oligarch. Prior to entering the private sector, he was a military officer.

Career
In November 1992, he went into business and founded the company Neftkonsult LLP. In 1993, Fedun was officially Dismissed from the Russian military and within the same year became the CEO of JSC. In 1996, Fedun became the Vice President of LUKoil Inc, of which Vagit Alekperov was a key figure. Fedun has met Alekperov in the 1980s while he was a teacher in the Siberian town of Kogalym. As of May 2006, Fedun was one of the main owners of IFD Kapital Group. In 2020, he donated 10 million rubles to the Vishnevsky Institute of Surgery to the fight against the novel coronavirus. In July 2021, Fedun offered £400 million to purchase Premier League club Wolverhampton Wanderers, which was rejected. On August 22, 2022, Leonid Fedun resigned as president of FC Spartak Moscow, selling 100% of his shares to Lukoil.

Personal life
Fedun is on his second marriage, has six children and lives in Moscow.

See also
List of Russian billionaires

References

Russian billionaires
Russian businesspeople in the oil industry
Russian chief executives
Living people
Businesspeople from Kyiv
1955 births
Russian football chairmen and investors
FC Spartak Moscow
Recipients of the Order of Honour (Russia)
Russian oligarchs
Russian businesspeople in Cyprus